Henodus  (from  , 'one' and  , 'tooth') is an extinct placodont of the Late Triassic period during the early Carnian age. Fossils of Henodus chelyops were found in the Estherienschichten Member of the Grabfeld Formation, near Tübingen, Germany. The single species within the genus is H. chelyops.

Henodus is the only placodont thus far found in non-marine deposits, suggesting it may have lived in brackish or freshwater lagoons.

Description
Henodus, like many other placodonts, had a superficial resemblance to a turtle. Like turtles, it had a shell formed from a plastron on the underside and a carapace on top. The carapace extended well beyond the limbs, and was made up of individual plates of bony scutes covered by plates of horn. However, the shell was composed of many more pieces of bone than that of turtles, forming a mosaic pattern. The armor was fused to its spine, and its limbs were situated in normal positions, unlike the turtle, where they are located inside the ribcage. The weak limbs of Henodus suggest it spent little, if any time on land.

Henodus also had a single tooth on each side of its mouth, though the remaining teeth were replaced by a beak. In addition, it had baleen-like denticles along the jaws, which combined with a unique feature of the hyoid and musculature indicative of rapid jaw closing indicate a filter feeding lifestyle. The head was squared-off at the front, just ahead of the eyes.

Paleo-ecology
More recently, however, it has been suggested that this placodont was an aquatic herbivore, scraping off vegetation from the bottom with its broad jaws. This suggestion has been brought up in a paper discussing the habits and morphology of Atopodentatus, another Mesozoic aquatic reptile formerly suggested to be a filter-feeder and bearing strongly convergent jaw adaptations, including a similar "hammerhead" jaw tips, though unlike Atopodentatus it's still believed that Henodus relied on filter feeding to obtain plant-matter from the substrates.

References

Further reading
 National Geographic, December 2005, p. 79, by Virginia Morrell
 Dixon, Dougal. The Complete Book of Dinosaurs. Hermes House, 2006
 Huene F von 1936. Henodus chelyops, ein neuer Placodontier. Palaeontographica A, 84, 99-147.
 Rieppel OC and Zanon RT 1997. The interrelationships of Placodontia. Historical Biology: Vol. 12, pp. 211–227
 Rieppel O 2000. Sauropterygia I. Placodontia, Pachypleurosauria, Nothosauroidea, Pistosauroidea. Handbuch der Paläoherpetologie, Teil 12A. München, Friedrich Pfeil.
 Rieppel, O. (2002). Feeding mechanisms in Triassic stem-group sauropterygians: the anatomy of a successful invasion of Mesozoic seas. Zoological Journal of the Linnean Society, 135, 33-63
 Darren Naish: Fossils explained 48. Placodonts. Blackwell Publishing Ltd, Geology Today, Vol. 20, No. 4, July–August 2004 online

Placodonts
Late Triassic reptiles of Europe
Fossil taxa described in 1936
Taxa named by Friedrich von Huene
Sauropterygian genera